Gham may refer to:

Apni Khushian Apne Gham, Hindi serial airs on TV Asia
Aur Bhi Gham Hain Zamane Mein, Indian TV serial broadcast fortnightly on Doordarshan in the early 1980s
Haji Gham, the second highest valley of the Skardu District of Gilgit-Baltistan in Pakistan
Kabhi Khushi Kabhie Gham..., Bollywood film directed by Karan Johar
Thodi Khushi Thode Gham (some happiness some sadness), an Indian Soap opera on Sony Entertainment Television India
Yaum e gham (Persian for "Day of Sorrow"), a day commemorated by Shia Muslims